Grannar (Neighbors) is a politically independent local Norwegian newspaper, covering events in Etne in Hordaland county and Vindafjord in Rogaland county. 

Grannar is published two times a week, on Mondays and Thursdays. The newspaper employs 11 people and it is published in Nynorsk. The paper's office is in the village of Etne.

Grannar was originally established as a newspaper for the municipalities of Ølen (now the northern part of the municipality of Vindafjord) and Etne. The paper then merged with the former local newspaper Vindafjordingen in 1989, after which it also covered events in the municipality of Vindafjord.

The newspaper is edited by Arne Frøkedal.

Circulation
According to the Norwegian Audit Bureau of Circulations and National Association of Local Newspapers, Gauldalsposten has had the following annual circulation:
2004: 3,893
2005: 3,858
2006: 3,875
2007: 3,929 
2008: 3,889
2009: 3,852
2010: 3,816
2011: 3,682
2012: 3,548
2013: 3,548
2014: 3,575
2015: 3,582
2016: 3,532

References

External links
Grannar home page

Newspapers published in Norway
Norwegian-language newspapers
Mass media in Hordaland
Etne
Publications established in 1973
1973 establishments in Norway
Nynorsk